SSSM can refer to:
 The Standard social science model
 The Solomon Schechter School of Manhattan, a K-8 Jewish day school located in Manhattan, New York City.
 Serious Sam: Siberian Mayhem, a 2022 video game